Nadix (born Nadir Hajro  on March 26, 1989 in Sarajevo) is a Bosnian trance musician, body builder and law graduate who has cerebral palsy.
He produces music in the genres of Psy, Trance, Tribal, Progressive, Tech House and Hard Techno. 
He has featured on BH Radio 1 in the "Tram Ride" show and on eFM Radio in the "Fast Forward Radio Show".

Discography

Albums 
2011 Sky Is A Limit [Purple Gate Records]

Compilation albums 
2012 Purple Gate Seampler Vol.3 [Purple Gate Records]

Singles/EPs 
2011 Road To Heaven EP [Purple Gate Records]
2011 Underground Sound EP [Purple Gate Records]
2012 Rhythm of the Soul EP [BK Electronics]
2012 Blue Sky EP [QBed Records]

References

External links
 Nadix on Discogs
 Nadix on Juno
 Nadix on Beatport

1989 births
Bosnia and Herzegovina musicians
Bosnia and Herzegovina trance musicians
Living people
Bosnia and Herzegovina bodybuilders